Seva Canada Society is a registered Canadian charitable organization whose mission is to restore sight and prevent blindness in the developing world. It was established in 1982 with help from Canadian International Development Agency (CIDA, now Global Affairs Canada). It is located in Vancouver, British Columbia. Seva Canada currently works in 12 counties around the world.

Seva Canada is rated as a four star charity on Charity Intelligence Canada.

History 
Seva Canada's sister organization Seva Foundation is located in Berkeley, California, and was co-founded in 1978 by Dr. Larry Brilliant, Ram Dass, Wavy Gravy, Nicole Grasset and Govindappa Venkataswamy. In 1982 Dr. Alan Morinis and Dr. Bev Spring established Seva Canada and secured funding from the Canadian International Development Agency (now Global Affairs Canada).

In 2015, in conjunction with Seva Foundation and the Kilimanjaro Centre for Community Ophthalmology, Seva Canada won the António Champalimaud Vision Award.

Programs 
Seva Canada focuses its efforts on five main categories:
 Sight restoration and blindness prevention programs
 Collaboration on the development of partner clinics, hospitals and institutions
 Funding and promotion of research internationally and in Canada
 Funding initiatives to integrate eye care with public health institutes
 Promotion and funding training and development of medical and non-medical personnel with overseas partner organizations

Honorary Patrons 

 The Right Honourable Adrienne Clarkson - Canada's 26th Governor General from 1999 to 2005
 The Honourable Lloyd Axworthy - Canadian politician, statesman and academic
 The Honourable Patrick Reid - Officer of the Order of Canada (1987)
 Leonard Cohen - late Canadian singer, songwriter, musician, poet, and novelist
 The Honourable Judith Guichon - 29th Lieutenant Governor of British Columbia

References

External links 
 

Blindness organizations in Canada
Health charities in Canada
1982 establishments in Canada